Enterprise-Record may refer to:

 Chico Enterprise-Record, a daily newspaper of Chico, California
 The Davie County Enterprise-Record, a weekly newspaper serving Davie County, North Carolina